Batchelor is a long established surname in England and Scotland, but the name has Anglo-Norman roots, and may also refer to a person in the glassmaking trade°. Some famous Batchelors:

 C. D. Batchelor (1888–1977), American cartoonist
 Casey Batchelor (born 1984), English glamour model and reality TV star
 Charles Batchelor (1845–1910), American inventor and associate of Thomas Alva Edison
 Claude Batchelor (born 1929), United States Army soldier
 Daniel Bacheler, also variously spelt Bachiler, Batchiler or Batchelar, (1572-1619), English lutenist and composer
 David Batchelor (disambiguation)
 Edward A. Batchelor (1883–1968), American sportswriter
 Erica Batchelor (born 1933), British figure skater
 Gary Batchelor, Canadian soccer player
 George Batchelor (1920–2000), Australian mathematician and fluid dynamicist
 Horace Batchelor (1898–1977), British businessman
 Jeff Batchelor (born 1988), Canadian snowboarder
 John Batchelor (disambiguation)
 Joy Batchelor (1914–1991), English director, producer, writer, art director and animator
 Lee Batchelor (1865–1911), Australian politician
 Leon Dexter Batchelor (1884–1958), American professor of horticulture and director of the University of California Citrus Experiment Station
 Peter Batchelor (born 1950), Australian politician
 Lillian Lewis Batchelor (1907–1977), American librarian
 Stephen Batchelor (agnostic) (born 1953), British writer and teacher
 Stephen Batchelor (field hockey) (born 1961), British field hockey player
 Todd A. Batchelor (born 1970), American businessman and politician

References

English-language surnames